Full Throttle Theatre Company is an organisation based in Townsville, North Queensland, Australia which is primarily focused on promoting theatre and the arts in the region. It is since 2010 successor of the professional Tropic Sun Theatre Company, itself formed from Tropic Line and Hard Sun theatre companies.

Full Throttle's earliest predecessor, Tropic Line, was founded by Jean-Pierre Voos in 1986 to replace Michael Lanchberry's Matchbox Co. which had ceased when he left James Cook University (JCU) in 1985. Tropic Line's main purpose was to offer senior students and graduates of Performing Arts at JCU the opportunity to present theatre at a professional standard and to meet a variety of critical audiences through touring.

In 2002, Tropic Line merged with its successor at JCU, Hard Sun, to become Tropic Sun.  The new company devoted itself, as did Tropic Line, to developing theatre in the NQ region. Voos died in early 2008. Madonna Davies and Karen Gibb took on the role of Co-Artistic Directors. Voos' death strongly affected the organisation, and it was soon realised that a new direction would need to be taken.

The company officially became "Full Throttle Theatre Company" in 2010, with the aim of attracting a younger audience and diversifying its services to encompass all the creative industries. It received a grant int 2010 from the state government to tour its production 3 Blokes and Their Barbies to regional and remote Queensland communities.

Tropic Sun Theatre Company

Tropic Sun showcased the talents of local actors, designers and directors as well as playwrights.

Tropic Sun produced an annual season of main house productions and, with its developmental arm "Terrifically Low Cost Theatre", provided other theatre services such as small avant-garde or local plays, tours, workshops and theatrical entertainment for business and institutional events. Tropic Sun focussed on local talent, particularly graduates from James Cook University. The ensemble of actors presented four major shows a year (including a play by Shakespeare) and several short plays mostly at the Old Magistrate's Court building in the city centre but also in other venues. Performances were often preluded by a pre-show dinner (or interval dinners for Shakespeare-in-the-Park).

Since October 2006 the company operated from the Old Magistrate's Court building. Along with funding from State and Federal Grants, the company was in 2006 given a funding boost of $40,000 by the Townsville City Council, an increase on the $15,000 the company received annually from the Council, to tide it over until it moved to the new "Arts Hub". Tropic Sun shared this new performing arts space with a capacity of 250–300 with dancenorth australia.

History
The production company was established in 1986. In 1988 Tropic Sun represented Australia at the Toga Mura Festival in Japan and in 2002 they represented Townsville at the Fortress Festival in Suwon, South Korea.

Artistic Director Jean-Pierre Voos was central to the development of Tropic Sun.  The company's first general manager Lorna Hempstead later returned to hold the same position.

In 2007 12 plays were staged including; Who's Afraid of Virginia Woolf, The Zim-Zoom Cabaret, Othello, The Dresser, His and Hers, A Stretch of the Imagination and Bombshells, additionally Tropic Sun will present a Shakespeare Festival together with an Olde English Fair.

During the May 2006 Townsville Shakespeare Festival, Shakespeare in the park was brought to Queens Garden with the performance of Romeo and Juliet which consequently toured to Cairns. Starring Kate Hooper and Matthew Ryan in the title roles and a supporting cast of seven actors playing a total of 18 characters. A traditional and practical set was built specifically for Romeo and Juliet under the huge native trees.

Set in the early 20th century Boston Marriage was a "darkly erotic comedy-of-manners" about two society ladies in a Boston marriage, starring Karen Gibb, Lynda Mullamphy and Katheryn Hooper and directed by Tropic Sun's Artistic Director Jean-Pierre Voos

References

External links
 
 Full Throttle Theatre Company History, including Tropic Sun and Tropic Line

Townsville
Theatre companies in Australia
Companies based in Queensland